Jordi Oriola Vila (born 21 June 1996) is a Spanish racing driver currently competing in the SEAT León Eurocup. He previously competed in the TCR International Series and European Touring Car Cup.

Racing career
Oriola began his career in 2007 in karting. After karting for 4 years, he switched to the SEAT León Supercopa France in 2012, he finished 12th in the championship standings that year. In 2013 he switched to the European Touring Car Cup, racing in the Single-makes Trophy. He finished 3rd in the championship standings, with 2 wins, 1 pole position and 5 podiums. In March 2015, it was announced that Oriola would make his TCR International Series debut with Campos Racing driving an Opel Astra OPC. Since 2014 Oriola has been competing in the SEAT León Eurocup.

Racing record

Complete TCR International Series results
(key) (Races in bold indicate pole position) (Races in italics indicate fastest lap)

† Driver did not finish the race, but was classified as he completed over 75% of the race distance.

References

External links
 
 

1996 births
Living people
Spanish racing drivers
European Touring Car Cup drivers
TCR International Series drivers
Campos Racing drivers
Engstler Motorsport drivers
TCR Europe Touring Car Series drivers